The Kewpie Chasma is a chasma on the surface of Ariel, the fourth largest moon of Uranus.

References 

Ariel (moon)
Surface features of Uranian moons